Nicolae Craciun (born 14 June 1994) is an Italian sprint canoeist.

He participated at the 2018 ICF Canoe Sprint World Championships.

Onorificenze

References

External links
 

1994 births
Italian male canoeists
Living people
ICF Canoe Sprint World Championships medalists in Canadian
Canoeists at the 2019 European Games
European Games medalists in canoeing
European Games silver medalists for Italy
21st-century Italian people